Duoni is a Southern Loloish language of Yunnan, China. Duoni is spoken in Jinping Miao, Yao, and Dai Autonomous County and Yuanyang County, Yunnan.

Distribution
In Yuanyang County, the Duoni people are found in the townships of  Niujiaozhai 牛角寨 and Zha'e 扎俄. In Jinping County, Duoni are located in Laojizhai Township 老集寨乡 (in the village clusters 行政村 of Masasi 马撒斯, Bailezhai 白乐寨, and Dazhupeng 大竹棚), comprising 793 households and 3,329 persons as of 2005.

References

You Weiqiong [尤伟琼]. 2013. Classifying ethnic groups of Yunnan [云南民族识别研究]. Beijing: Nationalities Press [民族出版社].

Southern Loloish languages
Languages of Yunnan